Sagadani Dam is a gravity dam located in Shimane Prefecture in Japan. The dam is used for flood control. The catchment area of the dam is 16.8 km2. The dam impounds about 7  ha of land when full and can store 828 thousand cubic meters of water. The construction of the dam was completed in 1957.

References

Dams in Shimane Prefecture
1957 establishments in Japan